This Much I Know to Be True is a 2022 British documentary film directed by Andrew Dominik. It is a companion to Dominik's documentary One More Time with Feeling (2016). The film had its world premiere on 12 February 2022 at the 72nd Berlin International Film Festival.

Synopsis
This Much I Know to Be True explores the creative relationship between Australian musicians Nick Cave and Warren Ellis. It features their first performances of songs from their last two studio albums, Ghosteen and Carnage. It was filmed in spring 2021 before their UK tour. Cave and Ellis are accompanied by singers and a string quartet. The film also features an appearance by Cave's longtime friend and collaborator Marianne Faithfull.

The performances are combined with interlude segments exploring the creation and themes of the music. The film also explores of the process of Cave writing The Red Hand Files, a website he uses to respond to questions from fans. It also includes a visit to Cave's workshop where he is working on a series of porcelain sculptures depicting the devil's life.

Cast
Nick Cave
Warren Ellis
Marianne Faithfull
Earl Cave
Andrew Dominik
Wendi Rose
Janet Ramus
T Jae Cole
Eloisa-Fleur Thom
Alessandro Ruisi
Luba Tunnicliffe
Max Ruisi

Production
Dominik was first contacted by Cave while Dominik was finishing work on his film Blonde about the life of Marilyn Monroe. Dominik's felt his schedule left him without the time necessary to travel to London and shoot during the COVID-19 pandemic. He initially planned to decline Cave's request, but felt compelled to accept upon relistening to Ghosteen. The film was shot in five days on location in London and Brighton. The performances were shot in Battersea Arts Centre.

Release
The film premiered on 12 February 2022 in the Berlinale Special section at the 72nd Berlin International Film Festival. The film was released worldwide on 11 May 2022 by Trafalgar Releasing in a global cinema event.

Reception
On Rotten Tomatoes, the film holds an approval rating of 100% based on 38 reviews, with an average rating of 8.10/10. The site's critics consensus reads: "A must-watch for Nick Cave fans, This Much I Know to Be True simply and soberly highlights the redemptive power of music." On Metacritic, it has a weighted average score of 81 out of 100 based on 14 critics, indicating "universal acclaim".

Wendy Ide of Screen Daily called it "simply executed but undeniably powerful in its lean, stripped back elegance." Jessica Kiang of Variety wrote, "This remarkable performance documentary may be for the Nick Cave-curious exclusively, but for them (us) it is close to essential."

References

External links

2022 films
2022 documentary films
British documentary films
Documentary films about rock music and musicians
Nick Cave and the Bad Seeds
Films directed by Andrew Dominik
Films set in Brighton
Films set in London
Films set in Bristol
2020s English-language films
2020s British films